{{DISPLAYTITLE:C24H25ClN2O}}
The molecular formula C24H25ClN2O (molar mass: 392.921 g/mol) may refer to:

 RTI-336
 RTI-371, or 3β-(4-Methylphenyl)-2β-[3-(4-chlorophenyl)isoxazol-5-yl]tropane

Molecular formulas